Sandy Mokwena (26 June 1949 – 25 January 2018), was a South African actor. He is best known for his roles in the popular serials Funeral for an Assassin, Tödliche Geschäfte and Scandal!.

Personal life
He was born on 26 June 1949 in Soweto, South Africa. He was married to Grace Mokwena. The couple had 4 kids, 3 daughters Ditshego , Keabetswe, Lebogang & 1 son Otsile Itumeleng

He died on 25 January 2018 in the morning of natural causes at the age of 68. The funeral service was held at the Grace Bible Church in Soweto on 26 January 2018. He was then buried at Heroes Acre in West Park Cemetery, Johannesburg.

Career
In 1972, he performed in the stage play Iphi Ntombi with the role 'Cappie'. With the play, he toured internationally and continued to play the role until 1984. and then in the television serial Going Up.

In 2005, he was selected for the role 'Bra Eddie Khumalo' in the television soap opera Scandal!. The show became highly popular where Sandy continued to play the role until his death in 2018. A memorial service was held at the Scandal! studios on Wednesday in honour of the 17 years he spent at the serial. Meanwhile, he played the role 'Ken Mokoena' in the serial Yizo Yizo 1.

Apart from Scandal!, he contributed many television productions such as Generations, Khululeka, Soul City, Justice for All and Zero Tolerance. Meanwhile, he worked in the films: Taxi to Soweto (1992), The Principal (1996), Dead End (1999) and Scarback (2000).

Filmography

References

External links
 
 Inside Sandy Mokwena's last day on set
 Scandal! stars remember Sandy Mokwena: His light will never fade
 Jerry Mofokeng pours his heart out about losing his friends, Bra Hugh & Sandy Mokwena

South African male television actors
1949 births
2018 deaths
South African male film actors
People from Soweto